Operation Manna was the codeword for a Second World War operation by the British and Greek forces in Greece in mid-October 1944, following the gradual withdrawal of the German occupying forces from the country.

The operation included an airborne element, which was conducted by the British 2nd Independent Parachute Brigade on 12 October, when elements of the 4th Parachute Battalion parachuted onto the Megara airfield  outside of Athens. The prevailing weather conditions forced the abandonment of further parachute operations and it was not until 14 October that the rest of the brigade, less the 5th Parachute Battalion, arrived. After landing, the 4th and 6th Parachute Battalions marched on Athens. On 16 October, the 5th Battalion and the brigade's glider-borne element arrived.

The 2nd Para Brigade was reinforced by the British 23rd Armoured Brigade, and the British force took over the protection of the city.

The British and Free Greek navies transported British and Greek troops, as well as the Greek government in exile, to Athens.

Notes

References

Conflicts in 1944
1944 in Greece
World War II operations and battles of Europe
Parachute Regiment (United Kingdom)
Land battles of World War II involving the United Kingdom
Aerial operations and battles of World War II involving the United Kingdom
Military operations of World War II involving Germany
Airborne operations of World War II
Glider Pilot Regiment operations
Military operations involving Greece
Military history of Athens
October 1944 events